Portsmouth is the second largest town in Dominica, with 2,977 inhabitants.  It lies on the Indian River on Dominica's northwest coast, in Saint John Parish. Cabrits National Park is located on a peninsula to the north of town.  Portsmouth has its own sea port in Prince Rupert Bay.

Portsmouth was initially chosen as the capital of Dominica, but only served in that capacity in 1760.  After malaria broke out there the same year, the capital was moved to Roseau, where it remains.

The Ross University School of Medicine, was located near Portsmouth, in Picard, but was relocated to Barbados, after Hurricane Maria caused extensive damages in 2017. 

A farmer's market runs Tuesdays, Fridays, and Saturdays in the city. The area is the birthplace of Exile One's Gordon Henderson, and local politician Roosevelt Douglas

Benjamin's Park is the primary sporting venue and has hosted first-class cricket. The area has many plans for tourism and employment in general. The Japanese Government is currently funding and constructing a fish processing plant in Portsmouth.

References

External links

Photos from Portsmouth

Populated places in Dominica
Saint John Parish, Dominica